Francisco Antonio Noguerol Freijedo (born 9 July 1976) is a Spanish former footballer who played as a central defender, currently assistant manager of Albacete Balompié.

He totalled 341 matches and two goals in Segunda División over 11 seasons, representing five teams in the competition. In La Liga, he appeared for Celta.

Club career
Noguerol was born in San Cristovo de Cea, Province of Ourense. After emerging through local giants RC Celta de Vigo's youth ranks he made his professional debut also in Galicia, loaned in the lower leagues. He rejoined Celta in the 2000–01 season but only appeared in four La Liga games, after which he returned to the second division, going on to have a steady career in that tier (for instance, from 2006 to 2008, at Albacete Balompié, he played 80 out of 82 possible league matches).

For the 2008–09 campaign, 32-year-old Noguerol returned to Celta, still in division two, for a third spell. He was relatively used in his two-year stay as the Vigo side constantly battled with relegation, eventually managing to stay afloat.

On 7 June 2015, after five seasons between Girona FC and Albacete, competing in both the second and third tiers, Noguerol announced his retirement at the age of 38, being immediately appointed manager of his last club's reserves. In 2016 he became an assistant to the first team, only to return to his previous role on 27 June 2018.

Managerial statistics

Honours
Celta
UEFA Intertoto Cup: 2000

References

External links

Celta de Vigo biography 

1976 births
Living people
People from O Carballiño (comarca)
Sportspeople from the Province of Ourense
Spanish footballers
Footballers from Galicia (Spain)
Association football defenders
La Liga players
Segunda División players
Segunda División B players
Tercera División players
Celta de Vigo B players
RC Celta de Vigo players
Pontevedra CF footballers
Racing de Ferrol footballers
Elche CF players
UD Salamanca players
Albacete Balompié players
Girona FC players
Spanish football managers
Segunda División managers
Tercera División managers
Albacete Balompié managers